The Einsatzgruppen trial (officially, The United States of America vs. Otto Ohlendorf, et al.) was the ninth of the twelve trials for war crimes and crimes against humanity that the US authorities held in their occupation zone in Germany in Nuremberg after the end of World War II. These twelve trials were all held before US military courts, not before the International Military Tribunal. They took place in the same rooms at the Palace of Justice. The twelve US trials are collectively known as the "Subsequent Nuremberg trials" or, more formally, as the "Trials of War Criminals before the Nuremberg Military Tribunals" (NMT).

The case
The Einsatzgruppen were SS mobile death squads, operating behind the front line in Nazi-occupied Eastern Europe. From 1941 to 1945, they murdered around 2 million people; 1.3 million Jews, up to 250,000 Romani, and around 500,000 so-called "partisans", people with disabilities, political commissars, Slavs, homosexuals and others. The 24 defendants in this trial were all commanders of these Einsatzgruppen units and faced charges of war crimes and crimes against humanity. The tribunal stated in its judgment:

The judges in this case, heard before Military Tribunal II-A, were Michael Musmanno (presiding judge and Naval officer) from Pennsylvania, John J. Speight from Alabama, and Richard D. Dixon from North Carolina. The Chief of Counsel for the Prosecution was Telford Taylor; the Chief Prosecutor for this case was Benjamin B. Ferencz. The indictment was filed initially on July 3 and then amended on July 29, 1947, to also include the defendants Steimle, Braune, Haensch, Strauch, Klingelhöfer, and von Radetzky. The trial lasted from September 29, 1947, until April 10, 1948.

Indictment
 Crimes against humanity through persecutions on political, racial, and religious grounds, murder, extermination, imprisonment, and other inhumane acts committed against civilian populations, including German nationals and nationals of other countries, as part of an organized scheme of genocide.
 War crimes for the same reasons, and for wanton destruction and devastation not justified by military necessity.
 Membership of criminal organizations, the SS, the Sicherheitsdienst (SD), or the Gestapo, which had been declared criminal organizations previously in the international Nuremberg Military Tribunals.

All defendants were charged on all counts. All defendants pleaded "not guilty". The tribunal found all of them guilty on all counts, except Rühl and Graf, who were found guilty only on count 3. Fourteen defendants were sentenced to death. However, only four of them were executed. Nine of those condemned had their sentences reduced. Another, Eduard Strauch, couldn't be executed since he had been transferred to Belgian custody after his conviction.

Defendants

The presiding judge, Michael Musmanno, explained his rationale for sentencing while testifying at the Frankfurt Auschwitz trials in the 1960s. He had chosen to impose death sentences in all cases where the defendant had actively participated in murder and failed to present mitigating circumstances. For example, although Erwin Schulz confessed to presided over the execution of 90 to 100 men in Ukraine, he received a 20-year sentence since he had protested an order to exterminate all Jewish women and children, and immediately resigned when he was unable to intervene. Superior orders was rejected as a defense.

Of the 14 death sentences, only four were carried out; the others were commuted to prison terms of varying lengths in 1951. In 1958, all convicts were released from prison.

Quotes from the judgment

The Nuremberg Military Tribunal in its judgement stated the following:

See also
 Commissar Order, an order stating that Soviet political commissars were to be shot on the battlefield.
 List of Einsatzgruppen with all known Einsatzgruppen
 Nuremberg executions

Notes

References
 Trials of War Criminals before the Nuernberg Military Tribunals under Control Council Law No. 10, Nürnberg, October 1946 – April 1949, Volume IV, ("Green Series) (the "Einsatzgruppen case")
 Description from the U.S. Holocaust Memorial Museum.
 Einsatzgruppen trials. Another description.
 Ferencz, Benjamin, “A Prosecutor's Personal Account: From Nuremberg to Rome", Journal of International Affairs, 52: No. 2, Columbia University, Spring 1999
 Benjamin Ferencz, Mémoires de Ben, procureur à Nuremberg et avocat de la Paix mondiale, Michalon, Paris, 2012 (French).

External link 

United States Nuremberg Military Tribunals
Holocaust trials
 
1947 in Germany
1948 in Germany